Priscilla Kolibea Mante is a Ghanaian neuropharmacologist, a researcher and lecturer from Kwame Nkrumah University of Science and Technology, currently based at the Kumasi campus. Her research work focuses on alternatives of plant-based therapeutic options to manage drug-resistant epilepsy and the neglected tropical disease neurocysticercosis. In her work, she mostly explores the anticonvulsant activity of the plant alkaloid cryptolepine and its solid-lipid nanoparticles in the management of neurocysticercosis-induced epilepsy. Her goal is to identify a way to help cryptolepine permeate more efficiently into the central nervous system to reduce the risk of convulsion, helping patients to manage their condition as effectively as possible. Aside from her studies of epilepsy, Mante has also worked toward new therapies to alleviate pain, anxiety, and depression.

In 2019, she was the only African recipient, and one of fifteen total, of the L'Oréal-UNESCO For Women in Science International Rising Talent Award. She is also a recipient of the 2018 L'Oréal-UNESCO For Women in Science Sub-Saharan Africa post-doctoral fellowship. She also went on to win the 2019 OWSD Early Career Fellowship.

Education 
Mante completed her secondary school education at the Wesley Girls’ Senior High School, Cape Coast, Ghana.   She earned a PhD in Pharmacology from the Kwame Nkrumah University of Science and Technology in 2013. Mante's doctorate research focused on the use of Antiaris toxicaria as an anticonvulsant, specifically in Ghana. During the same period she also researched plant-based therapies for the central nervous system. Mante had her post doctoral training at the University of Michigan Medical School in USA, where she was a recipient of the University of Michigan STEM Seed Grant.

Career 
Mante is a registered pharmacist with the Pharmaceutical Society of Ghana.  From 2010 to 2014, she worked as a pharmacist at Constant Pharmacy. Since 2013, Mante has worked at the Pharmacology Department of the Kwame Nkrumah University of Science and Technology where she is  a senior lecturer. She is a registered Pharmacist and currently chairs the Ghana Young Academy. Mante is also known for her passion for education and leading women in science to further their careers.

"The world will make room for us. The more women push for senior roles, the harder it will be to ignore them."—Dr. Mante, regarding the increasing presence of women in science

References

Living people
Ghanaian scientists
Ghanaian women academics
Ghanaian women scientists
University of Michigan Medical School alumni
Kwame Nkrumah University of Science and Technology alumni
Year of birth missing (living people)
Academic staff of Kwame Nkrumah University of Science and Technology
People educated at Wesley Girls' Senior High School